Renzo Tondo (born 7 August 1956) is an Italian politician, former President of Friuli-Venezia Giulia.

Early life 
He graduated in Political Sciences at the University of Trieste. He began his career as a hotel keeper.

Career

First political experiences 
Tondo moved into politics with the Italian Socialist Party, with whom he was elected mayor of his hometown Tolmezzo from 1990 to 1995.

First gubernatorial term 
In 1998, Tondo became Regional Councilor with Forza Italia. In 2001 he was appointed President of the Regional Council of Friuli-Venezia Giulia. In 2006, Tondo was elected to the Chamber of Deputies.

Second gubernatorial term 
In 2008, Tondo was re-elected President of Friuli-Venezia Giulia, supported by the centre-right coalition, defeating the incumbent governor Riccardo Illy, who was supported by the Democratic Party. Five years later, in 2013, Tondo was defeated by centre-left candidate Debora Serracchiani.

Responsible Autonomy 
In 2015 founded Responsible Autonomy, which later became part of Us with Italy. In 2018, Tondo was re-elected to the Chamber of Deputies as centre-right candidate in a single-seat constituency.

On 16 March 2018, Tondo was initially chosen by the centre-right coalition as candidate for president of FVG, but five days later Massimiliano Fedriga from the Northern League became the official candidate, and was later elected president.

References

External links 
Files about his parliamentary activities (in Italian): XV, XVIII legislature.

1956 births
Living people
Forza Italia politicians
The People of Freedom politicians
20th-century Italian politicians
21st-century Italian politicians
University of Trieste alumni
Deputies of Legislature XVIII of Italy